Doucet's musk shrew (Crocidura douceti) is a species of mammal in the family Soricidae. It is found in Ivory Coast, Liberia, and possibly Nigeria. Its natural habitat is subtropical or tropical dry forests.

Sources

Doucet's musk shrew
Mammals of West Africa
Doucet's musk shrew
Taxonomy articles created by Polbot
Taxa named by Henri Heim de Balsac